Sumter County Courthouse may refer to:

 Sumter County Courthouse (Alabama), Livinston, Alabama
 Sumter County Courthouse (Florida), Bushnell, Florida
 Sumter County Courthouse (South Carolina), Sumter, South Carolina